Principapillatus is a monospecific genus of velvet worm containing the single species Principapillatus hitoyensis. Males of this species have 26 to 29 pairs of legs, usually 27 or 28; females have 30 to 32, usually 30 or 31. This velvet worm is viviparous, with mothers supplying nourishment to their embryos through a placenta. This species was discovered in Costa Rica.

References

Further reading

Onychophorans of tropical America
Onychophoran genera
Monotypic protostome genera